Bill Kouélany (born 31 October 1965 in Brazzaville) is a Congolese artist, writer and set designer. In 2007, she participated in documenta 12 in Kassel with a multimedia art installation. She lives in Brazzaville, the capital of the Republic of the Congo.

Life and career 
As a teenager, B. Kouélany (as she prefers to be called) lived through the wars and violence in her native Congo. Years later the imprints of those early experiences can be found in her writings and art.

Writer 
A French speaker, her early writings include plays such as Cafard, cafarde (Cockroach, cockroach), which she presented in Paris (2003), and Peut-être (Perhaps) (2007), which she wrote with colleague Jean-Paul Delore. Her written pieces reveal evidence of influence by the notable Congolese poet and novelist Tchicaya U Tam’si, who is remembered as "a tormented and highly sensitive writer who [B. Kouélany] also featured in her first canvases." 

According to Chavelet, many of her writings have never been published (as of 2016).

Painter 
B. Kouélany's paintings reveal the artist's self-taught skills as well as their autobiographical elements, making her art sought out among international audiences in Africa and Europe. Since 2007, her work has been distributed internationally by the Peter Hermann Gallery in Berlin and the RDV Gallery in Nantes, France. 

In 2001, she took part in the residency program of the Doual’Art urban workshops in Cameroon. In 2002, her work was invited to the Dak’Art Biennale with the Creators of Central Africa, and in 2006 she submitted art to the seventh Dak’Art. In 2004, she was named an artist in residence in Nantes, France and took part in an exhibition there called Beautés d’Afrique (Beauties of Africa). In 2006, again at the Dak’Art Biennale exhibition, she received two prizes, the Prix de la Francophonie and Prix Montalvo Arts Center.

B. Kouélany's submission the following year to an exhibition called documenta 12 in Germany was widely noticed. The work, called Untitled, was a very large installation examining the consequences of war and violence.In 2007, B. Kouélany was the first sub-Saharan African woman to exhibit at Documenta in Kassel. She presented her largest piece to date: a paper maché wall with excerpts of texts from several international newspapers and warped videos of her face, in which she expresses, as a mother and daughter, her empathy toward the Congolese people.

Mentor 
In 2012, B. Kouélany founded the contemporary art center and workshop, Les Ateliers Sahm in Brazzaville, becoming its artistic director. The multidisciplinary center supports contemporary art in Congo and is devoted to supporting young artists, not only from her country but the remainder of the African continent as well. According to the Prince Claus Fund, the creation of Les Ateliers Sahm "is perhaps one of her greatest achievements."

She continues to work creatively. In 2019, she took part in the exhibition Prête-moi ton rêve (Lend me your dream) in Morocco, which featured other painters from African and was scheduled (at the time) to visit multiple countries.

Awards 
 2006: Prix de la Francophonie (France)
 2006: Montalvo Arts Center Prize (USA)
 2018: Officer of Arts and Letters, awarded by the French Ministry of Culture.
 2019: Prince Claus Prize in the Netherlands.

References

External links 
 Photos of installation by Bill Kouélany 

   

1965 births
Living people
People from Brazzaville
Republic of the Congo writers
Republic of the Congo people
Republic of the Congo women
Republic of the Congo women writers
Republic of the Congo painters